Harold Shaw (1906 – November 4, 1941) was an American racecar driver from Indianapolis.  He drove in relief of Willard Prentiss for two laps in the 1933 Indianapolis 500.  He wanted to enter the 1934 race but his entry was refused.  Primarily a sprint car driver, the 1933 Indy 500 was his only Championship Car experience.

Having won the 1941 Midwest Dirt Track Racing Association (MDTRA) championship, Shaw died of injuries sustained while warming up for a sprint car race at the Johnson County Fairgrounds in Franklin, Indiana.

References

External links

1906 births
1941 deaths
Racing drivers from Indianapolis
Indianapolis 500 drivers
AAA Championship Car drivers
Racing drivers who died while racing
Sports deaths in Indiana